Son Jong-hyun (born 30 November 1991) is a retired South Korean footballer who last played as a midfielder for Louisville City of the USL in 2016.

Career

College
Son played two years of college soccer at Holy Cross College (Indiana) between 2014 and 2015, where he scored 6 goals in 37 appearances, also tallying 4 assists.

Professional
Son signed with United Soccer League side Louisville City on 8 February 2016.

References

1991 births
Living people
South Korean footballers
South Korean expatriate footballers
Louisville City FC players
Association football midfielders
Expatriate soccer players in the United States
USL Championship players
Holy Cross College (Indiana) alumni